Portal (Charles Little Sky) is a mutant fictional character superhero appearing in American comic books published by Marvel Comics.

Publication history

The character first appeared as Charles Little Sky in Avengers #304 (June 1989) and as Portal in Darkhawk #5 (July 1991).

Fictional character biography
Native American Charles Little Sky was born in Hartsdale, New Mexico. As a teenager, he manifested his dimension-spanning powers during a confrontation between the Avengers and Puma, the superhuman protector of Little Sky's tribe.  Little Sky fled the reservation he lived on, moving to New York City where he took a job as a construction worker. He was followed by Puma, who had set out in pursuit of Little Sky out of fear that the powers he'd soon manifest would prove dangerous. When Puma finally tracked him down at Ellis Island, Little Sky's powers activated for the first time, opening a portal to the dimension where the U-Foes had been exiled, freeing them.  The U-Foes attempted to kill Little Sky to keep him from using his powers to banish them again, and the Avengers and Puma were forced to team up to protect him. During the fight, Little Sky escaped, using his powers and began traveling the dimensions.

Along the way he picked up a variety of weapons, including a gun that fired 'energy harpoons,' and learned to control his powers.  In one dimension he encountered Kistur, the leader of an intergalactic gang of criminals who was armed with one of the android Darkhawk bodies created by Dargin Bokk.  Kistur asked Little Sky to join the gang so they could use his powers to plunder other dimensions.  Little Sky refused and Kistur tried to kill him, but Little Sky fought back and ended up accidentally shooting Kistur's Darkhawk amulet, the focal point of his powers, out of his chest.  The loss of the amulet killed Kistur's Darkhawk body, and Little Sky removed and donned Kistur's body armor for further protection.  Worried that Kistur might revive, Little Sky attempted to destroy the amulet, but when that failed, he discarded it in another dimension.

Little Sky eventually managed to return to Earth, opening a portal to a museum in New York City that Chris Powell and his family were touring.  Powell transformed into his Darkhawk persona, and Portal, mistaking Powell for a reborn Kistur, attacked.  Darkhawk managed to incapacitate Portal, who was taken in federal custody by a Guardsman.  Portal had been injured during the fight and was placed in a hospital under the guard of Captain America.  The U-Foes wanted Portal to take them to a dimension they'd once happened upon while they were exiled from Earth, and they attacked the hospital.  Captain America, Darkhawk and Daredevil defeated the U-Foes, but Portal revived and after explaining how he had acquired parts of his armor from an opponent resembling Darkhawk, escaped to another dimension during the fight.

Portal surfaced again to retrieve his weapons and equipment from a federal research center, battling some Guardsmen. Portal was targeted by the Brotherhood of Evil Mutants led by Toad, whose member Sauron brainwashed Portal into assisting them.  He was rescued by Darkhawk, Spider-Man, and Sleepwalker, after which he escaped again into another dimensional warp.

Portal would later return as Darkhawk's ally, protecting New York in his stead at a time when Darkhawk seemed to be dying and needed time to recuperate.  During this time, Portal was targeted by Shaper, a superhuman snuff artist who'd targeted Darkhawk for death. Shaper ended up going after Portal instead when Portal began using Chris Powell's amulet to become the Darkhawk in Chris's place.  Meanwhile, members of the Mahari race, another alien species from the same home world as Kistur, took control of the Darkhawk ship in a plan to avenge Kistur.  They reanimated Kistur in a redesigned Darkhawk android as Overhawk, and went after Portal's family. In the end, Portal and Darkhawk managed to prevent them from destroying the Earth.

Charles is one of the few mutants that retained their superhuman powers after the M-Day. He is shown as the director of A.R.M.O.R. and he used his powers to transport Machine Man and Jocasta to the Marvel Zombies universe. He collects Jocasta after Machine Man retrieves a sample of the still-living Vanessa Fisk's tissues, but is forced to leave a badly damaged Machine Man behind. After fending off, with the help of Jocasta, Machine Man and the 616-Earth Morbius, the Zombies that invaded A.R.M.O.R., Portal discovered that some of them managed to escape. He then approved Morbius' project to re-form the Midnight Sons to destroy the living dead.

Powers, abilities, and equipment
Portal is a mutant capable of opening rifts in space passing through extra-dimensional warps to transport himself and others. His portals allow instantaneous travel between different vibratory-attuned planes of reality, or "dimensions". Opening a portal without preparation will give him access to another dimension completely at random. 

He seems to possess some talent for finding dimensions he has been to before, yet he could not immediately find Earth again once he first got lost in the dimensional planes. Presumably, then, Portal has a kind of extrasensory "marking" ability, allowing him to record the space/time coordinates of a dimension while he is present in it, so that he could return to it again in the future if he chooses. He could not automatically return to Earth because he had not consciously "marked" it before leaving. Portal is capable of using his powers for teleportation, traveling instantly across about a few miles within a single dimension. Trying to transport himself more than a few miles in one jump, however, will destabilize the portal and send him off into another dimension, even if he is trying to stay anchored in one. Dimensional warps created by Portal cease to exist when he is rendered unconscious.

Portal has also been shown to be able to home in on other people who have gone through one of his portals, opening a new gateway to retrieve or follow them if necessary.  He used this ability to rescue Spider-Man from the dimension he had thrown the wall-crawler into while under Sauron's control.  

Portal is also armed with a wide variety of weaponry, including a huge gun that shoots 'energy harpoons' (fires concussive force blasts capable of leveling an office building), a hand-weapon (capable of firing a fast-hardening adhesive substance which impedes physical movement of target), a wheel (a  throwing disc which can separate into components with independent guidance systems, each of which contains a burst of concussive force equal to several hand grenades), and a suit of body armor composed of alien materials that he stole from a dead Darkhawk android that has been outfitted to allow him to survive in space. Portal also carries a supply of adhesive ammunition contained in his belt, and a directional mechanism that focuses his warp power.

Little Sky also has a quantity of gymnastics training. He is highly skilled in the use of his own weaponry, and a skilled motorcyclist.

Dimensions and planets
Portal has reached a wide variety of dimensions with his powers, including:
The Asta Dimension, where he encountered Kistur
The Dark Dimension, home of the Mindless Ones, where he banished Spider-Man under the influence of Sauron
The Marvel Zombies dimension
The Mindscape, Sleepwalker's home dimension, which Sleepwalker once observed Portal pass through.
Null Space, the home of Dargin Bokk's Darkhawk ship.
The Szell Dimension, where he acquired the device that guides his teleportation.

He's also visited planets in unnamed dimensions, such as:
Jahraide, where he outfitted his armor with apparatus that lets him survive in space.

In other media

References

External links
http://www.marvel.com/universe/Portal

Comics characters introduced in 1989
Fictional characters from New Mexico
Fictional Native American people in comics
Marvel Comics characters who can teleport
Marvel Comics male superheroes
Marvel Comics mutants